Barbara Elizabeth Thiering (15 November 193016 November 2015) was an Australian historian, theologian, and biblical exegete specialising in the origins of the early Christian Church. In books and journal articles, she challenged Christian orthodoxy, espousing the view that new findings present alternative answers to its supernatural beliefs. Her analysis has been rejected by both New Testament scholars and scholars in Judaism.

Background
Born in Sydney, Australia, as Barbara Houlsby, she married Barry Thiering in the late 1940s.  She graduated in 1952 from the University of Sydney with First Class Honours in Modern Languages, was a high school teacher of languages for several years, and then, while caring for her three young children, continued study and research privately. She obtained an external B.D. degree from the University of London, a M.Th. degree from Melbourne College of Divinity, and a Ph.D. degree from the University of Sydney in 1973.

Pesher technique

Thiering claimed to have discovered, from her specialty study of the pesharim of the Dead Sea Scrolls, their semiotics, and their hermeneutics, a "pesher technique" for decoding the New Testament stories. Whereas Qumran-style pesher of the Dead Sea Scrolls decodes ancient prophetic writings to find contemporary apocalyptic meanings, Thiering's "pesher technique" claims that the gospel writers encoded contemporary facts in miracle stories to be told in the future. She also claims that the early Christian Church was a natural development of "Sons of Light" of the Qumram community. The theory argues that the miracles, including turning water into wine, the virgin birth, healing a man at a distance, the man who had been thirty-eight years at the pool, and the resurrection, among others, did not actually occur (as miracles), as Christians believe, nor were they legends, as some skeptics hold, but were "deliberately constructed myths" concealing (yet, to certain initiates, relating) esoteric historic events. She alleges that they never actually happened (that is, that the events they chronicle were not at all miraculous), as the authors of the Gospels knew. According to her interpretation, the pesher style of interpretation used by the Qumran community was also used by the authors of the Gospels; thus, they wrote on two levels. For the "babes in Christ," there were apparent miracles, but the knowledge of exact meanings held by the highly educated members of Gnostic schools gave a real history of what Jesus actually did.

Work

In view of her research publications in academic journals, she was invited to lecture at Sydney University, at first in the Department of Semitic Studies, then in the School of Divinity (now the Department of Religious Studies) where she continued until her retirement. During this time she was a member of the Board of Studies in Divinity and the Board of Continuing Education, and served for twelve years as a lay member of the New South Wales Equal Opportunity Tribunal. When her work became known in the United States, she was made a fellow of the Jesus Seminar.

In 1990, a documentary film about her research, Riddle of the Dead Sea Scrolls, was shown by the Australian Broadcasting Corporation.

Academic reception 

Thiering's thesis attracted some controversy in the media when Jesus the Man was published in 1990, and her ideas have not received acceptance by many of her academic peers. In a response to a letter Thiering wrote to The New York Review of Books objecting to a review by Géza Vermes, Vermes outlined the academic reception of her work stating:
"Professor Barbara Thiering's reinterpretation of the New Testament, in which the married, divorced, and remarried Jesus, father of four, becomes the "Wicked Priest" of the Dead Sea Scrolls, has made no impact on learned opinion. Scroll scholars and New Testament experts alike have found the basis of the new theory, Thiering's use of the so-called "pesher technique", without substance."

In 1993, N. T. Wright, New Testament historian and former Bishop of Durham, wrote:
It is safe to say that no serious scholar has given this elaborate and fantastic theory any credence whatsoever. It is nearly ten years since it was published; the scholarly world has been able to take a good look at it: and the results are totally negative.

James F. McGrath, an Associate Professor in the Religion and Philosophy department at Butler University in his 1996 review of the book states that Thiering's thesis lacks proof, and that she herself acknowledges that the pesher of the Revelation of St. John is her own composition.

Edna Ullman-Margalit, a former professor at the Hebrew University of Jerusalem, wrote:As an example consider the case of Barbara Thiering. She claims that the scrolls are the product of rivalry between the supporters of John the Baptist, identified with the scrolls’ “Teacher of Righteousness,” and Jesus, identified with the “Man of the Lie.” For my purposes this theory must be considered altogether initially outlandish, given the scientifically definitive dating (based mostly on paleographical and on radiocarbon techniques) of the scrolls to a period well before the birth of Christianity (Thiering, 1992). Thiering’s theory, by the way, is a good example of a fringe theory that is popular with the media.

Australian theologian Christopher Walker has written:
Barbara Thiering's identification of two of the main personalities of the Qumran Scrolls - the 'Teacher of Righteousness' and the 'Wicked Priest' with John the Baptist and Jesus respectively - has not convinced any professional working in the field. ... Her extensive use of the pesher technique to reinterpret the whole story of Jesus is equally unsupported by the scholarly community. ...

Despite her claims to the contrary, supporting evidence from the Scrolls is not to be found for most of her hypotheses. Having discovered the pesher technique, she uses it wholeheartedly and without discrimination. ...

As I have briefly indicated, her scholarly peers have found her arguments to be tenuous and unconvincing. Despite her assertions to the contrary, her presentation of Jesus owes far more to fictitious imagination than to historical research.

Death
Barbara Thiering died on 16 November 2015, the day after her 85th birthday.

Selected bibliography
Jesus the Man: New Interpretation from the Dead Sea Scrolls, re-issued in paperback with foreword by Barbara Thiering (Simon and Schuster, New York; November 2006).
 Jesus of the Apocalypse: The Life of Jesus After the Crucifixion (Transworld Doubleday 1995). (Translated into Japanese)
The Book That Jesus Wrote - John’s Gospel (Transworld Doubleday 1998)
Created Second? Key Aspects of Women's Liberation in Australia (Sydney, Family Life Movement of Australia, 1973)

References

External links
 Pesher Technique website of Dr. Barbara Thiering.
 The Pesher Technique, Barbara Thiering, reply by Geza Vermes
 
 Thiering's Profile at the Westar Institute
 Pesher and the Dead Sea Sectarians
 Sydney Morning Herald obituary 
 Theobald, Marjorie Rose (1941–) in The Encyclopedia of Women and Leadership in Twentieth-Century Australia

1930 births
2015 deaths
Alumni of the University of London
Alumni of University of London Worldwide
Australian biblical scholars
Australian women historians
Australian historians of religion
Female biblical scholars
Members of the Jesus Seminar
University of Divinity alumni
Academic staff of the University of Sydney